Sir Thomas de Ashton or Assheton (fl. 1446), was an English alchemist.

Ashton was born in 1403, the son and heir of Sir John de Ashton, of Ashton-under-Lyne, who died in 1428. His half-brother Ralph de Ashton seems to have inherited the main family home, Ashton Hall. From roughly this date, differences appear in the coat of arms, motto and spelling of the two families, indicating that Sir Thomas may have distanced himself from his unpopular half-brother.

Alchemy
Permission was granted by Henry VI to Sir Thomas to transmute the precious metals, and on 7 April 1446 a special order was issued, encouraging two Lancashire knights, Ashton and Sir Edmund de Trafford, to pursue their experiments in alchemy, and forbidding any subject of the king to molest them.

Descendants
Sir Thomas, born in Kingsley, Lancashire, England, married Elizabeth, daughter of Sir John Byron, by whom he had eleven children. The eldest son, John, was knighted before the battle of Northampton, 10 July 1460, was MP for Lancashire in 1472 and died in 1508.

Children
Elizabeth, b. 1431, married John Trafford Knight, d. 1488;
Douce, b. 1435, married Thomas (Sir) Gerard Knight, born 15 July 1431 in Kingsley, Lancs, England, died 27 March 1490 in  Kingsley, Lancs., England

Note
Thomas de Ashton (alchemist) is not, Sir Thomas de Ashton Lord of Croston d. 17 Oct 1407 and, is not the medieval Thomas de Aston, a 13th-century monk d. 7 June 1401: these two men are in Lincoln Cathedral.

Source information

Heritage Consulting. Millennium File [database on-line]. Provo, UT, USA: Ancestry.com Operations Inc, 2003.
Original data: Heritage Consulting. The Millennium File. Salt Lake City, UT, USA: Heritage Consulting.

References

1403 births
Year of death unknown
15th-century English people
English alchemists
Thomas
15th-century alchemists